Embassy of Estonia in Canberra is Estonia's diplomatic mission to Australia and New Zealand.

History
Australia first recognized Estonia on September 22, 1921, after Estonia's acceptance into the League of Nations. From 1919-1935, Estonia’s interests in Australia were represented by the Finnish Consulate (in 1922 Harold Tanner, a Finn, was named Deputy Honorary Consul in Sydney). In 1935 Estonia appointed its own honorary consul. The work of the consulate was interrupted in 1940 and its records were given to the Swedish Consulate for storage (today they have been returned to Estonia).

Australia was among the first countries to re-recognize Estonia's independence on August 27, 1991, while diplomatic relations were restored on November 21, 1991.

The first Ambassador of Estonia to Australia, Peeter Miller, was accredited from Tokyo (Japan) in 2007. In 2010 the accreditation was transferred to Tallinn.

In 2011 Estonia opened a Consulate General in Sydney. It was closed in 2015 when the Embassy of Estonia was established in Canberra. The Embassy was officially announced open on February 18, 2015.

Location
Since August 4, 2015 the Embassy of Estonia operates in the premises of the Embassy of Finland in Canberra. The embassy is located at Darwin Avenue in Yarralumla, ACT, Australia.

Estonian Ambassadors to Australia

Honorary Consuls 
Estonia has 4 Honorary Consuls in Australia (Adelaide, Brisbane, Hobart, Perth) and 1 Honorary Consul in New Zealand (Wellington).

See also
 Australia-Estonia relations

References

Estonia
Canberra
Australia–Estonia relations